Daventry International Rail Freight Terminal (DIRFT) is a rail-road intermodal freight terminal with an associated warehousing estate in Northamptonshire, England.

An extension, often referred to as DIRFTII, of about  received planning permission in 2005, and is designed to have all facilities rail connected – the first occupier of DIRFT2 was Tesco, whose distribution centre reached completion in late 2011.

A second extension DIRFTIII, also rail connected, is now underway.

History

DIRFT

Daventry International Rail Freight Terminal is part of a land development project undertaken by Severn Trent Water on a  site near Crick in Northamptonshire. The location, at junction 18 of the M1 motorway in close proximity to the A5, A14 and M6 roads had been identified as early as 1978 as a "motorway orientated growth point". The ground area of the original DIRFT development is divided into three sections: DIRFT Central , DIRFT East , and DIRFT South  by the A5 and A428 roads.

The site first became operational on 27 May 1997, and was officially opened in November 1997 by Anne, Princess Royal, at inception the facility included a  warehouse operated for road haulage operator Eddie Stobart Logistics. The rail connected terminal was operated by Tibbett and Britten; construction of a  rail connected warehouse was started in 1998, a second  facility was constructed in 2000.

DIRFT was one of the earliest post-Channel Tunnel road-rail intermodal terminals – the site includes rail connected terminals and traditional warehousing was designed to act as a regional node for rail freight flows to and from the Port of Felixstowe and the Channel Tunnel, it forms part of the UK network of the Trans-European Combined Transport network.

The site was primarily developed by Severn Trent Property, part of Severn Trent Water. Early occupiers included Royal Mail, Tesco ('Fastway RDC' operated by DHL) (closed 2009), and Mothercare.

Severn Trent plc sold its holding in DIRFT, as well as the  DIRFTII site to Prologis in 2006. In 2008 Malcolm Rail became the operator of the railport at DIRFT.

DIRFTII

The DIRFTII expansion was designed for rail connected warehousing allowing transfer between sea or channel tunnel born rail-freight and road transport or warehouse storage. Plans included facilities for containerised and side-loaded palletised rail freight.

Tesco acquired a  grocery distribution centre in 2011, constructed by VolkerFitzpatrick (main contractor), construction work was completed in September 2011. As part of the development, a rail tunnel was built under the A5 road to connect DIRFTII to the rail network via the original DIRFT railport.

DIRFTIII
A further 7.5 million sq.ft. extension, DIRFTIII,  was proposed for construction on the former Rugby radio station site to the northwest of the current development. The proposal also included a large area  of green space, named Lilbourne Meadows. The development is a joint venture between ProLogis and Rugby Radio Station Limited Partnership (RRSLP) (BT and Aviva). A related development is the Sustainable Urban Extension (SUE) built to the west of DIRFT as a suburb of Rugby – with over 6,000 homes planned. The development took on the name of Houlton and the first homeowners moved in during December 2017.

A planning application to the Infrastructure Planning Commission (IPC) was submitted in 2011, and was approved in July 2014.

See also

Kilsby and Crick railway station – Former railway station on the site of the rail freight terminal.

References

External links

, official site
, DIRFT official site

Railway freight terminals in the United Kingdom
Rail transport in Warwickshire
Rail transport in Northamptonshire
Buildings and structures in Northamptonshire